Argosy Casino Riverside is a riverboat casino located on the Missouri River in Riverside, Missouri, just north of Kansas City. It is one of several casinos in the Kansas City metropolitan area. It is owned by Gaming and Leisure Properties and operated by Penn Entertainment.

History
The casino opened on June 22, 1994 as the Argosy V, Kansas City's first riverboat casino. In 1996, a land-based pavilion was built that included restaurants, bars, and a parking garage. In 2003, the casino was renovated and in 2005 a hotel was added to the property. Penn National Gaming (now Penn Entertainment) acquired the Argosy Gaming Company in 2005.

Property information
The casino currently houses 62,000 square feet of gaming space, with 1,500 slot machines and 37 table games. It has a 258-room hotel, several restaurants, and 18,000 square feet of meeting space on the property.

See also
List of casinos in Missouri

References

External links

Hotels in Missouri
Casinos in Missouri
Riverboat casinos
Casinos completed in 1994
1994 establishments in Missouri